The Great South Australian Coastal Upwelling System is a seasonal upwelling system in the eastern Great Australian Bight, extending from Ceduna, South Australia, to Portland, Victoria, over a distance of about . Upwelling events occur in the austral summer (from November to May) when seasonal winds blow from the southeast. These winds blow parallel to the shoreline at certain areas of the coast, which forces coastal waters offshore via Ekman transport and draws up cold, nutrient-rich waters from the ocean floor.

Because the deep water carries abundant nutrients up from the ocean floor, the upwelling area differs from the rest of the Great Australian Bight, especially the areas offshore of Western Australia and the Nullarbor Plain in South Australia, which are generally nutrient-poor. Every summer, the upwelling sustains a bountiful ecosystem that attracts blue whales and supports rich fisheries.

The Great South Australian Coastal Upwelling System (GSACUS) is Australia's only deep-reaching coastal upwelling system, with nutrient-enriched water stemming from depths exceeding .

Recently, a new upwelling centre has been discovered on the western shelf of Tasmania. Since this new upwelling centre is located outside South Australian waters, the entire upwelling system should be rather called the Great Southern Australian Coastal Upwelling System.

Oceanographic processes

During the austral summer, high-pressure systems over the Great Australian Bight cause southeasterly winds to blow over the coasts of Victoria and South Australia. When winds blow parallel to the shoreline, Ekman transport pushes water to the left of the wind direction (in the southern hemisphere), which in this case is westward and offshore. To replace the water moving offshore, cold waters from the ocean floor rise to the surface. During upwelling events, local sea surface temperature drops by  2-3 degrees Celsius.

Key upwelling centres form in three different locations, described in the sub-sections below; the Kangaroo Island and Eyre Peninsula centres are linked by the same upwelling process. While the Bonney Upwelling, where the strongest and most reliable upwelling events occur, was reported and explored over 30 years ago, the full extent of the upwelling system was discovered only as recently as 2004.

Bonney Upwelling

The Bonney Upwelling is the largest and most predictable upwelling in the GSACUS. It stretches from Portland, Victoria to Robe, South Australia.

Kangaroo Island and Eyre Peninsula

Upwelling at Kangaroo Island and the Eyre Peninsula is different than at the Bonney Upwelling. Instead, field data and hydrodynamic modelling suggest that the upwelling follows from a chain of processes. This chain of processes starts in the deep submarine canyons of the Murray Canyon Group, located south of Kangaroo Island, where localized sub-surface upwelling brings a pool of cold water from the abyssal plains up to the continental shelf. This dense-water pool, named the Kangaroo Island Pool, drifts along the shelf bottom just offshore of Kangaroo Island and the Eyre Peninsula. When a classical wind-driven upwelling event occurs, normally two to three times a summer, cold water is upwelled from the pool, not directly from the ocean floor.

Ecology

Extensive upwelling of nutrient-rich water makes the GSACUS an important marine hot spot on Australia's southern shelves. During upwelling events, the abundance of the GSACUS ecosystem can approach that of some of the world’s most productive upwelling centers, such as those offshore of Peru, California, and Namibia.

During upwelling events, surface chlorophyll a concentrations, an indicator of phytoplankton abundance, increase tenfold. Phytoplankton blooms bring about swarms of krill, which in turn attract blue whales. Blue whales are found in various locations off the southeast coast of Australia, but most predominantly in the Bonney Upwelling region, which is one of 12 identified blue whale feeding sites worldwide. The feeding grounds may extend further northwest, encompassing the rest of the GSACUS, but incomplete whale surveys are insufficient to establish their true range.

Other marine life that thrives in the upwelling includes filter feeders like sponges, bryozoans, and corals. These animals feed predators such as seabirds, fishes, Australian fur seals, and penguins. The upwelling plays also an important role in the life cycle of juvenile southern bluefin tuna (Thunnus maccoyii), which accumulate in the eastern Great Australian Bight during the upwelling season and feed on sardines (Sardinops sagax) and anchovies (Engraulis australis). Furthermore, the many dead organisms that fall to the continental shelf support populations of southern rock lobster and giant crab.

Economic importance

The GSACUS supports a productive fishery, and local fishers recognize the bounty that the upwelling provides them. Every November, Portland, Victoria, hosts an Upwelling Festival to celebrate the abundance of the Bonney Upwelling, and to begin the summer fishing season.

Humans have exploited the GSACUS for thousands of years. Oral histories of local Aboriginal tribes indicate a close connection to the ocean, and said tribes may possibly have eaten beached whales. The Convincing Ground massacre, which took place near Portland, Victoria in 1829, arose over a dispute between European whalers and the Gunditjmara people over ownership of a beached whale. Beginning in the mid-1840s, whaling and sealing were established as organized industries off the Bonney Coast.

Today, southern rock lobster (referred to locally as crayfish) and trawling are the most important fishing industries in the Bonney Upwelling. whereas the upwelling off the Eyre Peninsula supports a large sardine fishery, operating chiefly out of Port Lincoln, South Australia.

Conservation

Next to the Great Barrier Reef, the GSACUS and its ecosystem can be regarded as one of Australia's natural wonders. Due to its importance as a blue whale feeding and aggregation site, in 2002 the Bonney Upwelling was listed as critical habitat "requiring effective protection from user impacts" under Australia's Environment Protection and Biodiversity Conservation Act 1999. In addition to the blue whale, one species of shark is listed as critically endangered, and five bird and two whale species are listed as endangered.

Significant reserves of natural gas are present beneath the Bonney Coast, and are undergoing exploration. Fears have been expressed that expanded gas drilling may threaten whales through noise pollution and ship collisions.

See also
Upwelling
Blue whale

References

External links
Photographs of the Bonney Upwelling
Images of marine life in the Bonney Upwelling

Beaches of South Australia
Ocean currents
Aquatic ecology
Oceanography
Fisheries science
Great Australian Bight